Salmon Cliff is the second prominent rock cliff south of Seabee Hook on the west side of Hallett Peninsula. Named by the New Zealand Geological Survey Antarctic Expedition (NZGSAE), 1957–58, for K.J. Salmon, physicist and scientific leader at Hallett Station in 1958.

Cliffs of Victoria Land
Borchgrevink Coast